Swami Sukhabodhananda is a guru from the Bangalore area of India.He was the only spiritual leader representing Hinduism at the 2005 World Economic Forum in Davos, Switzerland.
dftd

Works

WorldCat link to further books in Indian languages.

References

External links 
 Prasanna Trust

Hindu writers
New Age writers
Indian business speakers
Indian motivational speakers
Businesspeople from Bangalore
St. Joseph's College, Bangalore alumni
20th-century Indian male classical singers
1955 births
Living people
Singers from Bangalore